Lake Burera or Bulera is a lake of northwestern Rwanda, at the border with Uganda. With an area pf , it is the second largest lake entirely in Rwanda after Lake Ihema. The lake is located in a densely populated North of the country in Burera District which got its name from this lake. The closet major city is  the city of Musanze  West of the lake.

It lies to the North East of its twin Lake Ruhondo in which it empties via a stream called Ntaruka.

Due to this steep drop, a hydroelectric  power plant has been constructed on this stream and produces 11.5 MW.

References

Lakes of Rwanda
Ramsar sites in Rwanda